Erni Mangold (sometimes Ernie or Erna; born as Erna Goldmann on 25 January 1927) is an Austrian actress and stage director. Since 1948, she had appeared in more than 75 films and TV productions.

Life
Goldmann was born into a family of artists. The father was a painter, whilst her mother, who was likely to become a successful concert pianist, resigned to her career in favour of her family. She had piano lessons from age 4 to 14 years.

After being trained at Helmut Kraus's Drama School, Erni Mangold performed from 1946 to 1956 at Vienna's Theater in der Josefstadt. From 1955 to 1963, Gustaf Gründgens engaged her for Deutsches Schauspielhaus in Hamburg, afterwards she appeared at the Düsseldorfer Schauspielhaus under Karl Heinz Stroux. From 1972, she worked at Salzburg Mozarteum, later she taught in the Helmut Kraus's Drama School and at the Max Reinhardt Seminar, and from 1984 to 1995 she was professor at University of Music and Performing Arts, Vienna. In December 2017, at age 90, she retired from the stage after playing the role of Maude in a production of Harold and Maude.

Mangold's career as a film and television actress spans more than 70 years and includes more than 140 film and television productions since 1948. One of her best-known roles was the mistress of Hanussen, in the 1955 film of the same title. Among her roles in international film productions is a short but memorable turn as a palm reader in Richard Linklater's Before Sunrise (1995). As of 2020, she is still working as a film actress.

From 1958 to 1978, Erni Mangold was married to German actor Heinz Reincke. She lives, as of 2011, in Sankt Leonhard am Hornerwald, a little town in Waldviertel, Lower Austria.  In 2011, she published her memoirs, titled "Lassen Sie mich in Ruhe" which might be translated colloquially as "Get off my back!".

Selected filmography

1948: The Other Life – Mizzi
1948: The Angel with the Trumpet – Martha Monica Alt
1949: Lambert Feels Threatened 
1949: Dear Friend – Doris Thaller
1950: Großstadtnacht – Susi
1952: Abenteuer im Schloss – Mizzi
1953: Die Fiakermilli – Antonie Mannsfeld
1953: Lavender – Susanne
1953: The Bird Seller – Ernestine
1953: Arlette Conquers Paris – Mariilou Bergeret
1953: The Last Waltz
1954: Ein Haus voll Liebe
1954: The Forester of the Silver Wood – Karin
1955: Ingrid – Die Geschichte eines Fotomodells – Hanne, Ingrid's Sister
1955: Der falsche Adam – Dolly Dobbs
1955: Hanussen – Priscilla Pletzak
1956: ...und wer küßt mich? – Liane Neubert
1956: The Marriage of Doctor Danwitz – Jutta, Mannequin
1956: Lügen haben hübsche Beine
1956:  – Mientje
1956: A Heart Returns Home – Maxie Mell
1956: Uns gefällt die Welt – Lisa
1957: Tolle Nacht – Mannequin Ingrid Mai
1958: The Muzzle – Gutsituierte Dame
1959: Eva – Mizzi Schranz
1960: Storm in a Water Glass – Lisa
1960: Aufruhr (TV film) – Josie Flint
1960: Mrs. Warren's Profession – Liz
1966: Hafenpolizei: Der Nerz (TV series episode) – Tilda Faller 
1966: Die Hinrichtung (TV film) – Frau Reindl
1967: When Night Falls on the Reeperbahn – Wanda
1970: Der Kommissar: Die kleine Schubelik (TV series episode) – Martha Schubelik
1970: Das Geld liegt auf der Bank (TV film) – Anna Dietrich / Erna Dietrich
1972:  – Emma Jellinek
1972: Der letzte Werkelmann – Franzi
1972:  – Thussy Zwiesel
1974: Tatort: Mord im Ministerium (TV series episode) – Kora Wiesiewicz
1976: Duett zu dritt
1979: Kassbach – Seine Bekanntschaften
1981: Der Bockerer – Besitzerin des Café Tosca
1981: Den Tüchtigen gehört die Welt – Wirtin
1982: Zeitgenossen
1983: Tramps – Willies Bekanntschaft
1986: Mit meinen heißen Tränen (TV miniseries)
1993: Das Geheimnis – Anna Bäumer
1994: Kommissar Rex: Der Tod der alten Damen (TV series episode)
1995: Before Sunrise – Palm Reader
1995: Kommissar Rex: Gefährliche Jagd (TV series episode) – Frau Groh
1997: Qualtingers Wien – Praterfee
1998: Kommissar Rex: Mosers Tod (TV series episode) – Frau Schuster
1998: Drei Herren – Alte Frau
1998: Die 3 Posträuber
2001: Edelweiss (TV film) – Vera Dorfmeister
2002: Ein Hund kam in die Küche (TV film) – Mutter Blum
2003: Annas Heimkehr (TV film) – Josefa Schweighofer
2004: Bauernprinzessin (TV film) – Burgi
2004: Kommissar Rex: Das Donaukrokodil (TV series episode) – Frau Gruber
2007: Heile Welt – Karin's mother
2007: Weisse Lilien – Frau Danneberg
2007: Zodiak – Der Horoskop-Mörder (TV miniseries) – Gertrud Orlak
2007: Copacabana (TV film) – Rita
2008: Nordwand – Grossmutter Kurz
2008: Anonyma – Eine Frau in Berlin – Achtzigjährige Frau
2009:  – Alma Lukas
2010: Tod in Istanbul (TV film) – Mutter von Kurt Herder
2010: Kottan ermittelt: Rien ne va plus – Mutter Ziwoda
2010: Echte Wiener 2 – Die Deppat'n und die Gspritzt'n – Morak
2011: Anfang 80 – Herta
2014: Und Äktschn! – Frau Lupo
2014: Der letzte Tanz – Frau Ecker
2014: Therapy for a Vampire – Fräulein Sedlacek
2016: Hundraettåringen som smet från notan och försvann – Amanda Einstein
2017: La Pasada: Die Überfahrt – Flora
2018: Murer: Anatomie eines Prozesses – Oma Julius
2018:  – Frau im Pelzmantel im Bahnhof
2019: Der Gast – Die Mutter des Hausherrn

Literature
Erni Mangold: Lassen Sie mich in Ruhe – Erinnerungen. Aufgezeichnet von Doris Priesching. Amalthea 2011, 288 S.,

Decorations and awards
 1971: Kainz Medal
 2000: Kammerschauspieler
 2004/2005: Karl-Skraup Prize
 2005: Nestroy Theatre Prize in the category of Best Supporting Actor
 2006: Golden Medal of Honour for Services to the City of Vienna
 2009: Grand Gold Decoration for Services to the province of Lower Austria
 2012: Austrian Cross of Honour for Science and Art

References

External links
 

1927 births
Living people
Austrian film actresses
People from Tulln District
Recipients of the Austrian Cross of Honour for Science and Art
Austrian television actresses
Austrian stage actresses
Austrian theatre directors
20th-century Austrian actresses
21st-century Austrian actresses
Academic staff of Mozarteum University Salzburg
Academic staff of the University of Music and Performing Arts Vienna